The 1979 Reading Borough Council election was held on 3 May 1979, alongside local elections across England and Wales and the general election. All 49 seats on Reading Borough Council were contested.

Prior to the election, the council had been under no overall control, with the Conservatives the largest party. Labour saw the biggest net increase in its seats, gaining three, but the council remained under no overall control with the Conservatives as the largest party. After the election the Conservatives had 22 seats (down from 24), Labour had 16 seats (up from 13), and the Liberals had 11 seats (down from 12).

The party leaders on the council ahead of the election were Deryck Morton for the Conservatives, Geoff Mander for Labour, and Geoff Salisbury for the Liberals. Geoff Salisbury did not stand at the election, and the Liberals' former leader Jim Day became party leader again after the election, having spent the 19781979 civic year as mayor of Reading. Deryck Morton was re-appointed to the council's most senior political role as chair of the policy committee after the election, effectively leading a Conservative minority administration.

Results

Ward results
The results in each ward were as follows (candidates with an asterisk(*) were the previous incumbent standing for re-election, candidates with a dagger(†) were sitting councillors contesting different wards):

By-elections 19791983

Thames by-election 1980

The Thames ward by-election in 1980 was triggered by the resignation of Conservative councillor Eric Davies.

Christchurch and Redlands by-elections 1981
By-elections for the two wards of Christchurch and Redlands were held on 7 May 1981, alongside elections to Berkshire County Council. The Christchurch by-election was triggered by the resignation of Labour councillor Chris Goodall, and the Redlands by-election was triggered by the death of Conservative councillor John Lawford.

Abbey by-election 1981

The Abbey ward by-election in 1981 was triggered by the resignation of Labour councillor Graham Chapman.

References

1979 English local elections
1979